Nocardioides litorisoli is a Gram-positive, rod-shaped and non-spore-forming bacterium from the genus Nocardioides which has been isolated from soil near Sayram Lake in China.

References

External links
Type strain of Nocardioides litorisoli at BacDive -  the Bacterial Diversity Metadatabase

 

litorisoli
Bacteria described in 2017